Las Cabras is a Chilean commune and city in Cachapoal Province, O'Higgins Region. This commune is known for agriculture and handcrafts. The commune's name comes from the many goats (cabras, in Spanish) that used to be in the mountains.

Demographics
Of these, 7,548 (37.3%) lived in urban areas and 12,694 (62.7%) in rural areas. The population grew by 14.1% (2,504 persons) between the 1992 and 2002 censuses.

Administration
As a commune, Las Cabras is a third-level administrative division of Chile administered by a municipal council, headed by an alcalde who is directly elected every four years.

Within the electoral divisions of Chile, Las Cabras is represented in the Chamber of Deputies by Alejandra Sepúlveda (PRI) and Javier Macaya (UDI) as part of the 34th electoral district, together with San Fernando, Chimbarongo, San Vicente, Peumo and Pichidegua. The commune is represented in the Senate by Andrés Chadwick Piñera (UDI) and Juan Pablo Letelier Morel (PS) as part of the 9th senatorial constituency (O'Higgins Region).

Localities 
 El Durazno

References

Communes of Chile
Populated places in Cachapoal Province